Acetomicrobium hydrogeniformans is an anaerobic and moderately thermophilic bacterium from the genus of Acetomicrobium which has been isolated from oil production water from North Slope Borough in the United States.

References

External links
Type strain of Acetomicrobium hydrogeniformans at BacDive -  the Bacterial Diversity Metadatabase

Bacteria described in 2012
Synergistota